Rajjammana is a small village in the Matale District of Sri Lanka, located within Central Province.
Most of its inhabitants are farmers. It has a mini hydroelectric power plant, and the ministry has also proposed building a water cleaning plant in the future.

See also
List of towns in Central Province, Sri Lanka

External links

Populated places in Matale District